Typographia Sport Club was a Hungarian football club from the town of Budapest.

History
Typographia SC debuted in the 1906–07 season of the Hungarian League and finished fifth.

Name Changes 
1903–1909: Typographia Sport Club
1909: dissolved
?-1934: Typographia FC
1934–1944: Typographia Nyomda Torna Egylet
1944–1945: Nyomdász NSE
1945–1950: Typographia Nyomda Torna Egylet
1948: merger with Compactor SC
1950: merger with Állami Nyomda
1950–1951: Tipográfia Állami Nyomda
1951: merger with Kőbányai Lombikba
1951–1952: Állami Nyomda SK
1952–1953: Szikra Állami Nyomda
1953: merger with Óbudai Szikrával
1953–1954: Budai Szikra
1954–1957: Szikra Állami Nyomda
1957: exit from Budapesti Szikrából
1957–?: Typographia TE

References

External links
 Profile

Football clubs in Hungary
Defunct football clubs in Hungary
1903 establishments in Hungary
Association football clubs established in 1903